Malgassophlebia is a genus of dragonfly in the family Libellulidae. It contains the following species:
Malgassophlebia bispina 
Malgassophlebia mayanga 
Malgassophlebia mediodentata 
Malgassophlebia westfalli

References

Libellulidae
Anisoptera genera
Taxa named by Frederic Charles Fraser
Taxonomy articles created by Polbot